Ostrovec-Lhotka is a municipality in Rokycany District in the Plzeň Region of the Czech Republic. It has about 100 inhabitants. The village of Ostrovec is well preserved and is protected by law as a village monument zone.

Administrative parts

The municipality is made up of villages of Ostrovec and Lhotka.

References

Villages in Rokycany District